Cheruvathur is a town and grama panchayat in the Kasaragod district, state of Kerala.

Transportation
Local roads have access to NH-66 which connects to Mangalore in the north and Kannur in the south. The nearest railway station is Cheruvathur on Mangalore-Palakkad line. There are airports at Mangalore and Kannur.

References

External links

 http://wikimapia.org/156695/

Cheruvathur area
 Cities and towns in Kasaragod district